Thomas Ward Crowther (born 1986) is a professor of ecology at ETH Zürich and co-chair of the advisory board for the United Nations Decade on Ecosystem Restoration. At ETH Zürich, he started Crowther Lab, an interdisciplinary group of scientists exploring the role of biodiversity in regulating the Earth's climate. Crowther is the founder of Restor, an online platform that provides ecological data, connectivity, and transparency to conservation and restoration projects around the world. In 2021, the World Economic Forum named Crowther a Young Global Leader.

Career 
Crowther conducted his undergraduate and PhD studies at Cardiff University, under the supervision of Dr. Hefin Jones.  Following his PhD, Crowther received a postdoctoral fellowship from the Climate and Energy Institute at Yale University. In 2015, Crowther was awarded a Marie Curie fellowship to research the impact of carbon cycle feedbacks on climate change at the Netherlands Institute of Ecology (NIOO). In 2017, Crowther started a tenure-track professorship at ETH Zürich.

Research 
Crowther’s research centers on global ecology, with a focus on soil biodiversity and plants. In the journal Science, he wrote that soil organisms represent the most biologically diverse community on land, governing the turnover of the largest organic matter pool in the terrestrial biosphere. In other publications, his research has mapped the distribution of mycorrhizal fungi and nematodes across global soils, revealing the importance of these soil organisms for global carbon cycling.

Crowther’s work highlights how warming of soils can increase the rates of carbon emissions from soil. In 2016, Crowther’s research suggested that warming might stimulate the activity of soil organisms in high-latitude arctic and sub-arctic soils, leading to the loss of 30 Gt of Carbon by 2050, which could accelerate climate change by 12-17%. As a result, he stresses that protecting the soil community might be one of the best way to buffer ecosystems against these potential impacts of climate change.

His research explores the patterns of plant growth. In 2015, Crowther showed that the Earth is home to approximately 3.04 trillion trees. The research also estimated that the total number of trees has declined by almost half since the agricultural revolution 12,000 years ago, and Earth continues to lose around 10 billion trees each year. Research on global forests also showed that there are over 79,000 tree species in the global forest system, and that the productivity of forests increases as species diversity increases.

Crowther’s work has estimated the global tree restoration potential, showing that there are 0.9 billion hectares of land where trees would naturally be able to grow outside of urban and agricultural land.  If this land could be protected, the study suggested that this is room for one trillion new trees, and the recovering ecosystems could capture over 205 Gt Carbon. Crowther has described nature restoration as one of the most effective carbon drawdown strategies to date, with the potential to help people, biodiversity, and climate.

A complete overview of Crowther’s research publications can be found at his Google Scholar profile.

Tech for nature 
In a 2020 TED Talk, Crowther announced development of an online platform for the conservation and restoration of nature. Described as a “Google Maps for nature,” Restor is an online open data platform and not-for-profit organization that provides ecological data, transparency, and connectivity to nature-based solutions. In 2021, Restor was a finalist for the Royal Foundation’s Earthshot Prize in the Protect and Restore Nature category. As of early 2022, the platform connected and supported more than 70,000 conservation and restoration projects worldwide.

As part of his research, Crowther compiled a large inventory of tree data based on a combination of satellite observations and on-the-ground ecological research.  In 2016 he co-founded the Global Forest Biodiversity Initiative (GFBI), which manages the world's largest tree-level forest inventory database with over 30 million observations of tree measurements from 1.2 million locations around the world. The database was used to identify that across the global forest system, a greater number of tree species consistently leads to increases in the carbon storage of local forests, even with the same number of trees.

Policy and engagement 
Based on the global tree potential research, the World Economic Forum (WEF) launched its Trillion Trees initiative in January 2020 in partnership with Lynne and Marc Benioff. Crowther now serves on the advisory board of 1T.org. In 2021, Crowther Lab was appointed as a supporting partner to the UN Decade on Ecosystem Restoration, and Crowther serves as co-chair of the advisory board for the Decade on Ecosystem Restoration.

The research has also featured in the United Nations’ Trillion Tree campaign and a similar initiative with the same name led by WWF and BirdLife international, which aims to protect and regenerate 1 trillion trees within healthy ecosystems across the globe.

Criticism 
Following the publication of the paper on global tree restoration potential, a number of scientists criticized the idea that planting trees across the globe is a simple solution to climate change.  In particular, several articles suggested that it is dangerous and misleading to propose that tree planting can be a silver bullet to stop climate change.

In his 2020 TED Talk, Crowther agreed with those criticisms, stating that ecosystem restoration cannot be used as an excuse to ignore the challenges of cutting greenhouse gas emissions and protecting existing ecosystems. He has also emphasized that ecosystem restoration is not simply about planting trees for carbon capture. Instead, it is about the many solutions that promote the protection, regeneration and sustainable management of nature for local people and the biodiversity that they depend on. In an interview with the BBC, Crowther warned about the risks of mass tree plantations, highlighting the need for socially and ecologically responsible restoration of ecosystems across the globe.

References and selected publications

External links

Crowtherlab

Living people
1986 births
British ecologists
Forestry academics